GXF may refer to:

 Gaby's Xtraordinary Files, a Philippine educational television series
 General Exchange Format
 Gila Bend Air Force Auxiliary Field, in Arizona, United States
 Global X Funds, an American investment company
 Sayun Airport, in Yemen